Olau Line was a shipping company that existed from 1956 to 1994. It operated a ferry service from the United Kingdom to the Netherlands from 1974 until 1994. Originally based in Denmark, the company passed under the ownership of the German TT-Line in 1980.

History
Olau Line was founded in 1956 by the Danish businessman Ole Lauritzen. Originally the company concentrated in chartering tankers and cargo ships to other shipping companies, but in 1974 Olau Line started a car/passenger ferry services from Sheerness in the United Kingdom to Vlissingen in the Netherlands and from Copenhagen (Denmark) to Aalborg (Denmark). The latter line was closed after merely a month of service. Between 1974 and 1976 the consistence of Olau's fleet varied greatly, until in 1976 the company acquired M/S Apollo from Rederi AB Slite and renamed her  and chartered M/S Finnpartner from Finnlines, renaming her . These two ships formed the Olau fleet for the next four years.

In 1977 Olau attempted to start a service from Sheerness to Dunkirk, France, but this was not successful. By the end of the 1970s the company was in heavy debt, and in 1979 Ole Lauritzen was forced to sell 50% of Olau Line to the West Germany-based TT-Line. The following year Lauritzen sold his remaining shares of the company to TT-Line. At this time the TT-Line logo was adopted as the new logo for Olau Line, but with red and blue colours instead of TT-Line's yellow and blue. TT-Line decided to invest in new, large state-of-the-art cruiseferries for Olau services. Unlike Olau's earlier ships, most of which were registered in the United Kingdom, the new ships were registered in TT's homeland Germany.

In the late 1980s TT-Line decided to replace the Olau Hollandia and Olau Britannia with new ships. In 1986 and 1987 the company had taken delivery of two cruise ferries for their route between Germany and Sweden, and it was decided that two additional sisters of the same type would be built for Olau Line.

The new Olau Hollandia and Olau Britannia were more than twice the size of the old ships, and they soon proved to be too large for the route they were built for unless working practices could change. Due to high operating costs the ships were taken out of the German ship registry (which required expensive German crewing) and registered in Luxembourg in January 1993, but action by the German Seamen's Union, whose members crewed the vessels, forced the ships to be re-registered in Germany just a month later. In 1994 TT-Line made plans to move the ships under Bahamian flag, but when the German Seamen's Union protested again, TT-Line decided to close down Olau Line in May 1994.  At the time P&O Ferries were looking for new tonnage for their Portsmouth to Le Havre route and had identified the two Olau ships as suitable, while TT-Line (which had also been having financial issues) did not want the distraction of continuing labour issues at its UK subsidiary.

Following the closure of Olau Line the second Olau Hollandia and Olau Britannia were chartered to P&O Ferries, who used them successfully for many years on the Portsmouth—Le Havre service.

Ships
Not a complete list.

 (1974–1975)
 (1974–1975, chartered)
 (1974–1976)
 (1975–1976, chartered)
 (1976–1980)
 (1976–1981, chartered)
 (1980–1981, chartered)
 - (1980-1988)
 (1982–1990)
 (1989–1994)
 (1990–1994)

References

Notes
Unless otherwise noted, all data is from Olau Line at Simplon Postcard, retrieved 20 May 2007.

Bibliography

External links
  Olau Line fleet list at Fakta om Fartyg

Defunct shipping companies of the United Kingdom
Ferry companies of the Netherlands
Ferry companies of England
Sheerness
Vlissingen
Companies based in Zeeland